Eustenancistrocerus is an Afrotropical, Palearctic and Oriental genus of potter wasps. The species in this genus include:

 Eustenancistrocerus amadanensis (Saussure, 1856)
 Eustenancistrocerus askhabadensis (Rad., 1886)
 Eustenancistrocerus baluchistanensis (Cameron, 1907)  
 Eustenancistrocerus blanchardianus (Saussure, 1855) Eustenancistrocerus egidae (Giordani Soika, 1936)
 Eustenancistrocerus haarlovi Giordani Soika, 1962
 Eustenancistrocerus inconstans (Saussure, 1863)
 Eustenancistrocerus iratus Giordani Soika, 1990
 Eustenancistrocerus israelensis Giordani Soika, 1952
 Eustenancistrocerus jerichoensis (Schulthess, 1928)
 Eustenancistrocerus jucundus Giordani Soika 1962
 Eustenancistrocerus khuzestanicus Giordani Soika, 1970
 Eustenancistrocerus lufirae Meade-Waldo, 1915
 Eustenancistrocerus malus Giordani Soika, 1970
 Eustenancistrocerus nilensis (Giordani Soika, 1935)
 Eustenancistrocerus parazairensis (Giordani Soika, 1934)
 Eustenancistrocerus pharaoh (Saussure, 1863)
 Eustenancistrocerus roubaudi (Bequaert, 1916)
 Eustenancistrocerus spinosissimus Gusenleitner, 2000
 Eustenancistrocerus spinosus Gusenleitner, 1998
 Eustenancistrocerus sulcithorax Giordani Soika, 1970
 Eustenancistrocerus tegularis (Moravitz, 1885)
 Eustenancistrocerus transitorius (Morawitz 1867)

References

 Carpenter, J.M., J. Gusenleitner & M. Madl. 2010a. A Catalogue of the Eumeninae (Hymenoptera: Vespidae) of the Ethiopian Region excluding Malagasy Subregion. Part II: Genera Delta de Saussure 1885 to Zethus'' Fabricius 1804 and species incertae sedis. Linzer Biologischer Beitrage 42 (1): 95-315.

Hymenoptera genera
Potter wasps